Vyacheslav Yuryevich Zemlyansky (born 9 May 1986) is a former Russian professional football player.

Club career
He played two seasons in the Russian Football National League for FC Baikal Irkutsk and FC Baltika Kaliningrad. He played also beach soccer in 2017.

References

External links
 
 

1986 births
People from Svetly
Living people
Russian footballers
Association football midfielders
FC Baltika Kaliningrad players
FC Novokuznetsk players
FC Smena Komsomolsk-na-Amure players
FC Tosno players
FC Baikal Irkutsk players
Sportspeople from Kaliningrad Oblast